Life Goes On is a studio album by Paul Williams, released in 1972.

Notable songs from the album include "I Won't Last a Day Without You" and "Out in the Country".

Jackson Browne and Linda Ronstadt sang background vocals on the title track.

Jimmy Webb arranged the strings on "Rose."

"Where Do I Go from Here" selected as ending title for "Thunderbolt and Lightfoot", and also recorded by Elvis Presley for album Elvis.

Track listing 
All tracks composed by Paul Williams; except where indicated

Side One
 "The Lady Is Waiting"
 "Out in the Country" (Paul Williams, Roger Nichols)
 "Little Girl"
 "Rose" (Paul Williams, Mentor Williams)
 "Where Do I Go from Here"

Side Two
 "Life Goes On" (Paul Williams, Craig Doerge)
 "Park Avenue"
 "I Won't Last a Day Without You" (Paul Williams, Roger Nichols)
 "Traveling Boy" (Paul Williams, Roger Nichols)
 "That Lucky Old Sun" (Beasley Smith, Haven Gillespie)

Personnel
Paul Williams - vocals
David Spinozza - guitars
Leland Sklar - bass
Craig Doerge - piano
Michael Utley - organ
Russ Kunkel - drums, percussion
Bobbye Hall - percussion
Bob Cooper - oboe on "Little Girl"
Danny Kortchmar - acoustic guitar on "I Won't Last a Day Without You" 
Jackson Browne, Linda Ronstadt, Gerry Beckley, Ronee Blakley - background vocals on "Life Goes On"
Mentor Williams - background vocals on "Rose"
Jimmy Webb - string arrangement on "Rose"

Charts

References

External links
Paul Williams Official

1972 albums
Paul Williams (songwriter) albums
A&M Records albums
Albums recorded at A&M Studios
Albums recorded at Sunset Sound Recorders
Albums recorded at Olympic Sound Studios